Thinking Strategically: The Competitive Edge in Business, Politics, and Everyday Life is a non-fiction book by Indian-American economist Avinash Dixit and Barry Nalebuff, a professor of economics and management at Yale School of Management. The text was initially published by W. W. Norton & Company on February 1, 1991.

Overview
The book discusses issues of strategic behaviour, decision making, and game theory. The authors present the main concepts, such as backward induction, auction theory, Nash equilibrium, noncooperative bargaining, to a general audience. Each concept is illustrated by examples from common life, business, sports, politics, etc.—as applying game theory to real life may be the best way of crystallizing the best options available.

Reception

—Review by Financial Times

See also
1984 Orange Bowl
Co-Opetition: A Revolution Mindset that Combines Competition and Cooperation also co-authored by Barry Nalebuff
Coordination game
Tragedy of the commons
Thinking, Fast and Slow

References

External links
 Excerpt from the book

1991 non-fiction books
Game theory
Popular science books
American non-fiction books
Business books
W. W. Norton & Company books